Oscar Sherman Wyatt Jr. (born July 11, 1924) is an American businessman and self made millionaire. He was the founder of Coastal Corporation and a decorated bomber pilot in World War II. In 2007 the U.S. federal court in Manhattan tried him for illegally sending payments to Iraq under the Oil-for-Food Program.

Early history
In 1924 Oscar Wyatt was born into poverty in Beaumont, Texas, left by an alcoholic father and raised by a single mother in Navasota, Texas.

At age 16 he began earning money by flying planes, working as a crop duster for a nearby farm. A strong student, Wyatt was accepted to attend Texas A&M University but, in the midst of World War II, he left after a year of school in 1942 to enlist in the United States Army Air Forces as a pilot. Serving as a combat aviator in the South Pacific, Wyatt was wounded twice during battle and was decorated by age 21. After the war, he worked as a farmer to pay his way through Texas A&M and earn a degree in Mechanical Engineering. Out of college, he sold drill bits to small oil companies from the trunk of his Ford Coupe, and worked for Kerr-McGee and Reed Roller Bits before becoming a partner in Wymore Oil Company.

In 1955, he took an $800 loan on his car and used it to found Coastal.

Texas oilman
A 2007 Texas Monthly magazine article called Wyatt the real "J. R. Ewing" of the Oil Business and described Oscar and his fourth wife Lynn Sakowitz, a fixture of Houston social, fashion together as the beauty and the beast. Known as a shrewd businessman, Wyatt was both beloved and hated, litigious and charitable. A personal friend of Iraq's Saddam Hussein and business partner to Libya's Muammar Qaddafi, Wyatt urged President George H. W. Bush not to go to war with Iraq over Kuwait and later negotiated with Saddam to secure the release of western hostages being held in Baghdad.  Wyatt entered the refining industry in the early 1960s, and he began to attend Organization of Petroleum Exporting Countries (OPEC) meetings in Vienna, Austria. The U.S. refineries were optimized for high sulfur ("sour") crude oil, so Wyatt began to buy Iraqi oil in 1972. Wyatt retired as the Coastal Corporations chairman in 1997 yet continued to serve as Executive Committee chairman until Coastal's sale to the El Paso Natural Gas Company in January 2001.

The Coastal Corporation
Wyatt founded Coastal States Gas Producing Company in 1955. Coastal began business in modest circumstances, with 68 miles of pipeline and 78 employees. He produced gas, and collected it from other smaller producers to sell at a better rate to larger pipeline companies.

Expanding through acquisitions and expanding across multiple sectors, Coastal became a diversified energy company. Coastal produced and marketed petroleum, natural gas, electricity, and coal. It also sold gasoline at Coastal-branded gas stations: by 1999, Coastal Refining and Marketing operated 962 gas stations across in 33 states and was supplied by four refineries, including a 150,000 bbl per day refinery in Corpus Christi, Texas, a 180,000 bbl per day refinery in Eagle Point, New Jersey, a 250,000 barrel per day refinery on Aruba, and a 25,000 bbl per day refinery geared for asphalt production in Chickasaw, Alabama. Coastal Corporation also owned and operated a fleet of oil tankers, tugs, and barges. Sales in 1991 totaled $9.549 billion. Coastal Corporation was a major supplier of marine diesel in the Caribbean, natural gas in Colorado, and heating oil in the Northeast. Coastal was a key natural gas producer and distributor along with competitors Enron, Williams, and El Paso Energy, which Coastal later merged with. Coastal produced, gathered, processed, transported, stored and marketed natural gas throughout the United States and by the 1990s Coastal's 20,000-mile pipeline network, including the Iroquois and Great Lakes pipeline, completed in 1991, and the Empire State Pipeline, completed in 1992, transported five billion cubic feet of natural gas daily. As of 1999, Coastal was a Fortune 500 company with 13,300 employees and annual Revenues of $8.2 billion.

Proxy fight

Iraq
While El Paso Energy was selling Coastal's petroleum marketing and production assets off piece by piece to competitors Valero, Sunoco, and ConocoPhillips, Wyatt was being investigated for illegally doing business with Iraq in violation of sanctions imposed by the United Nations that strictly regulated Iraqi sales of crude oil. In 2007 Wyatt pleaded guilty in a U.S. federal court for illegally sending payments to Iraq under the Oil for Food program. At his sentencing hearing, Wyatt's attorney, Gerald Shargel, pointed to a commission report led by former Federal Reserve Board Chairman Paul Volcker that concluded that about half of the 4,500 companies in the Oil-for-Food Program paid a total of $1.8 billion in kickbacks and illicit surcharges to Saddam's regime. Wyatt's defense also floated the issue of "vindictive prosecution"—that is, the Bush administration singling out its old nemesis in both the oil patch and politics for punishment while leaving other possible violators of the sanctions alone. Prosecutors, in turn, amassed a daunting paper trail and rewarded a few former Iraqi petrocrats with help in obtaining U.S. green cards—as long as they agreed to testify against sanction breakers like Wyatt. In October 2007 Wyatt pleaded guilty to conspiring to, under the Oil for Food program, make illegal payments to Saddam Hussein's Iraq. Wyatt received a one-year prison sentence, and was sentenced to serve in the minimum security camp at the Federal Correctional Complex, Beaumont, in Beaumont, Texas.

Comeback
After stepping down from Coastal, Wyatt continued to consult with other petroleum related interests to help them improve their processes and procedures, and maximize their pipeline and refinery operations, resulting in better returns for common shareholders. Wyatt invested in frozen foods distribution and, in July 2001, created a new company - the NuCoastal Corporation, renamed Coastal Energy - to explore energy opportunities available across the globe, including Malaysia, and sold Coastal Energy for $500 million in 2013.

References

  Coastal Energy
  Texas Monthly 2001
  Forbes
  Texas Monthly 2007

Further reading

External links

1924 births
Living people
American businesspeople convicted of crimes
American businesspeople in the oil industry
American chief executives
American prisoners and detainees
American white-collar criminals
Aviators from Texas
Businesspeople from Texas
Criminals from Texas
People from Beaumont, Texas
Military personnel from Houston
People from Navasota, Texas
Prisoners and detainees of the United States federal government
Texas A&M University alumni
United States Army Air Forces bomber pilots of World War II